Carey Ng Sue Mun also known as Carey Ng (Pha̍k-fa-sṳ: Tsông Su̍k-fui), is a Malaysian Chinese director, model and beauty pageant titleholder who was crowned Miss Malaysia 2013. She represented Malaysia at the Miss Universe 2013 and ended up did not make it to the semifinalists round, this is the 43rd consecutive year Malaysia did not placed in Miss Universe pageant.

Miss Universe

Miss Universe Malaysia 2013 
Ng competed in her country's national beauty pageant Miss Universe Malaysia 2013, held 10 December 2012 at the Setia City Convention Centre, where she became the eventual winner of the Miss Universe Malaysia title, gaining the right to represent her nation as the official representative of Malaysia to the 2013 Miss Universe pageant. Ng also won four of the eight subsidiary titles of the pageant, including the ELV Boditude Award, A Cut Above's Miss Crowning Glory Award, Advertlets’ Miss Social Media Savvy Award, and the K-Swim Best Body Award.

Miss Universe 2013 
Ng participated in Miss Universe 2013 representing Malaysia but did not placed.

National Director of Miss Universe Malaysia Organization 
Ng was appointed as the national director of the Miss Universe Malaysia Organization (MUMO) in September 2014. She received criticism from pageant fans over the crowning of Miss Universe Malaysia 2015, Vanessa Tevi. The results were also criticised by French fashion and beauty expert, Inès Ligron on her Facebook posting. In 2016, a couple of days after the crowning of Kiran Jassal (Miss Universe Malaysia 2016), Ng resigned as national director of the pageant.

Career
In her modelling career, Ng has graced the covers of Female Magazine, August Man and FHM.   In July 2015, Ng modelled in a spread for Style Magazine which featured bags by Louis Vuitton.

Ng has appeared in television advertisements for MyEG and MAS, and is an official ambassador for Reebok Malaysia.

Personal life
Ng wed entrepreneur Roen Cian Nagapan in 2017. The couple has two daughters.

References

External links
Miss Universe Malaysia 2013
Official Twitter
Carey Ng Official Facebook

1988 births
Living people
Malaysian people of Chinese descent
Malaysian beauty pageant winners
Miss Universe Malaysia
Miss Universe 2013 contestants